
Longxing may refer to:

Longxing (competition), a Chinese Go competition

Places 
Longxing Temple, (隆興寺) a Buddhist temple in Zhengding County, Hebei, China
Longxing Subdistrict (龙兴), a subdistrict in Shilong District, Pingdingshan, Henan, China
Longxing, Heilongjiang (龙兴), a town in Longjiang County, Heilongjiang, China
Longxing, Shanxi (龙兴), a town in Xinjiang County, Shanxi, China
Longxing Prefecture, the name of Nanchang from 1164 to 1368

Historical eras
Longxing (龍興, 25–36), era name used by Gongsun Shu
Longxing (隆興, 1163–1164), era name used by Emperor Xiaozong of Song

See also
Longxing Temple (disambiguation)